A number of motor ships have been named MS Europa after the mythical Europa and the continent of Europe:

 , a cargo ship destroyed at Liverpool in 1941 during an air raid
 , an ocean liner operated by Lloyd Tiestino 1952–1976
 , a combined ocean liner / cruise ship operated by the North German Lloyd 1965–1970 and Hapag-Lloyd 1970–1981
 , a cruise ship operated by Hapag-Lloyd 1981–1999
 , a cruise ship operated by Hapag-Lloyd 1999–present

Additionally: 
 , a cruiseferry operated by Silja Line 1993–present
 Costa Europa, a cruise ship operated by Costa Cruises 2002–present

See also 
  for steamships with that name
 Europa (disambiguation) for other things named Europa

Ship names